The Sanctuary of Our Lady of Good Counsel (Albanian: Shenjtërorja e Zojës së Këshillit të Mirë) or Church of Our Lady is a shrine to Mary used by the Roman Catholic community of Shkodër, Albania. At the foot of Rozafa Castle, the church began construction in 1917 under the Austro-Hungarian occupation of Albania during World War I. Highly revered by Albanian Catholics, it was demolished as a cult object during the Albanian Cultural Revolution, only to be rebuilt after the fall of communism.

History
A set of old walls at the site had long been venerated by Catholics as the ruins of a church to Our Lady of Good Counsel and by Muslims as that of a Bektashi Order khanqah. Ecclesiastical historian Daniele Farlati described an active dervish khanqah in the 18th century. The Ottoman government blocked off the walls when quarrels arose over which faith was entitled to their use, referring the matter to a commission including Jusuf Effendi Golemi and Shani Dedëjakupeva, who held that both Catholics and Muslims could worship there.

In 1917, the Catholic clergy gained Austro-Hungarian approval to build the church, provoking protests by Muslims in front of the Ministry of War building in Vienna. The church was dedicated to Our Lady of Good Counsel and completed in 1930. The Archbishop of Shkodër, Jak Serreqi, laid the cornerstone on March 25, 1917, and was buried there in 1922.

In 1946, after the communist takeover, over two thousand pilgrims visited, but not long after, it was turned into a ballroom and eventually would be destroyed during the Cultural Revolution. After the fall of communism, the church was rebuilt and its cornerstone was blessed by Pope John Paul II in 1993. The project was funded by Simeone Duca, a noted theologian belonging to the Arbanasi community of Albanians in Zadar, Croatia.

References

Churches in Albania